Exarmidium is a genus of fungi in the family Hyponectriaceae.

Species
As accepted by Species Fungorum;

Exarmidium biseptatum 
Exarmidium blumeanum 
Exarmidium calotropidis 
Exarmidium clypeatum 
Exarmidium diaphanum 
Exarmidium ericae 
Exarmidium excellens 
Exarmidium hemisphaericum 
Exarmidium hysteriiforme 
Exarmidium inclusum 
Exarmidium kleinmondense 
Exarmidium lacustre 
Exarmidium marchicum 
Exarmidium weirii 

Former species;
 E. caesalpiniae  = Clypeothecium caesalpiniae, Hyponectriaceae
 E. fusariisporum  = Microdochium fusariisporum, Amphisphaeriaceae
 E. indicum  = Clypeothecium indicum, Hyponectriaceae
 E. morthieri  = Zignoella morthieri, Chaetosphaeriaceae

References

External links
Index Fungorum

Xylariales